John William Walmsley (22 April 1903 – 1970) was an English professional association footballer who played predominantly as a wing half. Born in Accrington, Lancashire, he initially played Sunday league football for St Paul's and Accrington St Peter's. Walmsley started his senior playing career in Non-League football with Bacup Borough before joining Football League Third Division North side Nelson in 1921. He played just one match for Nelson, appearing at centre-half in the 2–4 defeat to Wrexham on 26 November 1921.

Walmsley left the club at the end of the 1921–22 season to join Barnoldswick Town. After spending two years with Barnoldswick, he moved back into the Football League, signing for Accrington Stanley in the summer of 1924. He made nine league appearances for the side in his first season as the team finished 17th in the division. The following campaign, he played eight times in the league as Accrington achieved an 18th-placed finish. He left the club at the end of the 1925–26 season, and subsequently had spells with Barnoldswick Town, Great Harwood and Horwich RMI before moving into local amateur football in the early 1930s.

References

1903 births
1970 deaths
People from Accrington
English footballers
Association football defenders
Bacup Borough F.C. players
Nelson F.C. players
Accrington Stanley F.C. (1891) players
Barnoldswick Town F.C. players
English Football League players
Great Harwood F.C. players
Leigh Genesis F.C. players